AVANT Airlines was a Chilean airline, belonging to Turbus. It started flying in 1997 and closed down in 2001.

History
AVANT Airlines made its first flights to La Serena in 1997. In the following months AVANT was flying to different cities of Chile. In 1998 it acquired another Chilean airline, National Airlines, for 24 million US Dollars.

In 1999 AVANT went into bankruptcy despite having 30% of the Chilean air market. The Chilean airline was owned by the Diez family, which also owned bus company TurBus. Its last flight was in 2001, a flight from Calama to Santiago, bringing the airline's existence to an end.

Fleet

 9x 737-200

References

External links

Defunct airlines of Chile
Airlines established in 1997
Airlines disestablished in 2001
2001 disestablishments in Chile
Chilean companies established in 1997